Sam Nariman Variava (born 8 November 1940) is an Indian Judge and former Justice of the Supreme Court of India.

Career
Variava was enrolled as an Advocate on 22 June 1964 and started practice on the Original side of the Bombay High Court as well as in the Bombay City Civil Court. He passed LL.M. and also served as a part-time Professor of Law in the Sydenham College of Commerce and Economics in Bombay. On 21 November 1986 he was appointed Additional Judge of the Bombay High Court, thereafter became permanent Judge on 12 June 1987. Variava became the Chief Justice of Delhi High Court on 25 May 1999. He was elevated in the post of Justice of the Supreme Court of India on 15 March 2000 and retired on 8 November 2005 from the post of judgeship.

See also
Variav

References

1940 births
Living people
Indian judges
Justices of the Supreme Court of India
Chief Justices of the Delhi High Court
Judges of the Bombay High Court
20th-century Indian judges
20th-century Indian lawyers